Memphis was a village in DeSoto County, Mississippi, United States. The population was 87 at the 2000 census. In 2004, the village of Memphis officially became part of the town of Walls.

Geography
According to the United States Census Bureau, the village has a total area of 4.4 square miles (11.3 km2), of which 4.3 square miles (11.2 km2) is land and 0.1 square mile (0.1 km2) (1.14%) is water.

Demographics
As of the census of 2000, there were 87 people, 27 households, and 25 families residing in the village. The population density was 20.2 people per square mile (7.8/km2). There were 27 housing units at an average density of 6.3/sq mi (2.4/km2). The racial makeup of the village was 91.95% White, 6.90% African American and 1.15% Pacific Islander.

There were 27 households, out of which 51.9% had children under the age of 18 living with them, 85.2% were married couples living together, 3.7% had a female householder with no husband present, and 7.4% were non-families. 3.7% of all households were made up of individuals, and none had someone living alone who was 65 years of age or older. The average household size was 3.22 and the average family size was 3.28.

In the village the population was spread out, with 28.7% under the age of 18, 9.2% from 18 to 24, 32.2% from 25 to 44, 19.5% from 45 to 64, and 10.3% who were 65 years of age or older. The median age was 32 years. For every 100 females, there were 85.1 males. For every 100 females age 18 and over, there were 87.9 males.

The median income for a household in the village was $74,375, and the median income for a family was $76,109. Males had a median income of $49,583 versus $12,083 for females. The per capita income for the village was $49,289. None of the population was below the poverty line.

Education
The Village of Memphis is served by the DeSoto County School District.

References

Geography of DeSoto County, Mississippi
Memphis metropolitan area